Chetan Bhagat (born 22 April 1974) is an Indian author, columnist and YouTuber. He was included in Time magazine's list of World's 100 Most Influential People in 2010. Five of his novels have been adapted into films.

Early life and education
Bhagat grew up in a traditional Punjabi Hindu family. His father served as a lieutenant colonel in the Indian Army and his mother worked as a scientist in Indian Agricultural Research Institute, New Delhi. He was schooled at the Army Public School, Dhaula Kuan. He claims to have been an average student at 15. His love for writing began during his school years. He used to write articles for the literary magazine of his school and seeing his name printed on the magazine as a writer gave him intense pleasure. This encouraged him to write more in the coming years.

Bhagat graduated with a B.Tech. degree in Mechanical Engineering from the Indian Institute of Technology, Delhi in 1995 as a 9+ pointer.

Bhagat then went on to pursue an Masters of Business Administration degree in marketing from the Indian Institute of Management, Ahmedabad (IIMA) and graduated in 1997. In June 2018, IIMA awarded him the "Young Alumni Achiever's Awards 2018" in the Art & Entertainment category.

Personal life 
Chetan married Anusha Suryanarayan in 1998. He met her during their college days at IIM. One of his novels, “2 States” was inspired by his real-life love story. They have two twin sons named Shyam Bhagat and Ishaan Bhagat.

Career

Banking 
After graduating with a masters of business administration degree in 1998, Chetan was placed through his campus at Peregrine Investments Holdings in Canada. However, he lost this job within six months as the company closed its operations in 1998. His next job was as an investment banker with Goldman Sachs at their Hong Kong office. Despite being unhappy with his boss, he stayed on and kept this boss in mind when he characterised the villain in his second novel One Night @ the Call Center. He spent most of his time at the Goldman Sachs office in writing, completing and revising drafts of his first novel, Five Point Someone. After two years, Rupa Publications accepted his manuscript and offered to publish it.

By 2006, he was vice-president, Strategic Investment Group, Deutsche Bank in Hong Kong. His second novel, One Night @ the Call Center, was published in 2005 and became a best-seller. In March 2008, Bhagat moved back to India with his wife and three-year-old twin sons. He joined as a director in Deutsche Bank's distressed-assets team in Kodak House, Mumbai. The same year his third novel, The 3 Mistakes of My Life, was published and sold seven lakh (700,000) copies in three months.

In 2009, he quit his banking career to write full-time.

Bhagat is also a popular motivational speaker and has spoken at more than 800 organizations in 1000 cities around the world.

Author 

Chetan Bhagat started writing his very first novel “Five Point Someone” when he was working at Goldman Sachs in Hong Kong in the early 2000s. In an interview, he said he wrote about 15 drafts of the novel and also sent the final manuscripts to several publishers. The manuscript was finally accepted by a publishing house named Rupa Publications in Delhi and was published in the year 2004. This very first venture took him to peaks of fame and popularity. This novel narrated the story of three IIT students who consider themselves to be below average students among other students at IIT. The story was adopted by film director Rajkumar Hirani into a film named “3 Idiots” starring famous Indian stars Aamir Khan, R. Madhavan, Sharman Joshi and Kareena Kapoor. The movie turned out to be one of the most successful Bollywood movies of all time.

After the huge success of his first novel, he started working on his second book “One Night At The Call Centre” which was published in the year 2005. The novel went on to become yet another major success. In the first 3 days of its release, almost 50,000 copies were sold. This novel became India's fastest selling book of its time. The book was also adapted into a movie named “Hello” and Chetan along with Atul Agnihotri wrote the script for the movie.

Chetan then decided to make writing a full-time career. His third novel “The 3 Mistakes of my life” published in 2008 also became a huge success. This novel became a bestseller and Chetan also became the most successful English-Language writer in India. The Bollywood hit movie “Kai Po Che” is based on this novel.

Chetan's fourth novel “2 States”, published in the year 2009 was inspired by his real-life love story. The story is about how he fell in love with a South Indian girl and the troubles he faced in his love life. The book was adapted into a movie with the same name starring Arjun Kapoor and Alia Bhatt and became a massive success.

Chetan's later novels named “Revolution 2020”, “Half Girlfriend” and “One Indian Girl” gained a lot of appreciation and commercial success.

His novels, “The Girl in Room 105”, published in 2018, “One Arranged Murder”, published in 2020 and his latest novel “400 days”, published in 2021 turned out to be bestsellers.

Screen presence 
Chetan was a celebrity judge along with Marzi Pestonji and Preity Zinta on the dance reality show named “Nach Baliye” season 7 that aired on the Indian television channel Star Plus.

Chetan was also seen in Netflix’s series Decoupled, which stars R. Madhavan in the lead role. In the show, Madhavan plays the second bestselling author in India, while Chetan plays himself as India's bestselling author and Madhavan's rival.

Screenwriting 
Five of his novels have been adapted into movies. The film 3 Idiots released in 2009 (based on his novel Five Point Someone), was a major success. For Kai Po Che (2013) based on his novel The 3 Mistakes of My Life, Bhagat was one of the four screenplay writers. The film was a commercial success and Bhagat, along with Pubali Chaudri, Supratik Sen and Abhishek Kapoor won the Filmfare Award for Best Screenplay for Kai Po Che! at the 68th Filmfare Awards.

Writing style 
Chetan Bhagat's writing style is very different from other authors. He is known for making books readable for the average Indian. He has constantly been an inspiration to aspiring writers.

He believes in keeping it simple which helps him engage with the audience, who don't really want to refer to a dictionary while reading books. The audience also find it easier to relate to his books as the context of his books are usually based on actual events from their lives.

Bhagat also invests a lot of time in creating the characters of his books so that his target audience can relate to them in a better way. His stories usually have an Indian touch in them which make them even more interesting. With his vivid and humorous way of depicting stories, he has inspired reading habits in many young Indians.

Columns 
Chetan Bhagat is a newspaper columnist, and has written op-ed columns for English and Hindi newspapers, including Times of India and Dainik Bhaskar, focusing on youth and issues based on national development ranging from education, society and economy. Some of the topics that he has written about in the past are mentioned below:

 Youth and Indian development issues
 India's socio-cultural evolution
 Motivation and inspiration
 Investment banking as a side business
 Risk assessment

Youtube 
Chetan is a YouTuber along with being an author and motivational speaker. His YouTube channel is all about providing motivation tips to the young Indians. He has many subscribers and the same has been increasing with every passing day.

He has recently launched his podcast show Deeptalk with Chetan Bhagat where he invites a list of accomplished guests for a heart-to-heart conversation about how they made it big in life. The podcast show has gained a lot of appreciation from his target audience. Chetan believes that it is their journey that would inspire and motivate today's youth.

Some of the guests that have been a part of the podcast show were Ritesh Agarwal (founder and Group CEO of OYO), Nikhil Kamath (co-founder and CFO at Zerodha), Vineeta Singh (CEO, and co-founder of SUGAR Cosmetics), etc.

Filmography 
Five of Chetan's novels have been adapted into films:

 Hello (2008) – Based on the book “One Night at the Call Center”

A tale about the events that happen one night at a call center, told through the views of the protagonist, Shyam. A story of almost lost love, thwarted ambitions, absence, etc.

 3 Idiots (2009) – Based on the book “Five Point Someone”

A story about two friends who are searching for their long lost companion. They revisit their college days and recall the memories of their friend who inspired them to think differently, even as the rest of the world called them “idiots”.

 Kai po che! (2013) – Based on the book “The 3 mistakes of my life”

A story of three friends growing up in India at the turn of the millennium set out to open a training academy to produce the country's next cricket stars.

 2 States (2014) – Based on the book “2 States”

A story about a romantic journey of a culturally opposite couple – Krish Malhotra and Ananya Swaminathan. They meet at the IIM-Ahmedabad College and during the program they fall in love.

 Half Girlfriend (2017) – Based on the book “Half Girlfriend”

A story about the relationship between a village boy who comes from Bihar and a high class girl from Delhi.

Web series 
Chetan has been a part of the popular Netflix show named Decoupled which stars R Madhavan and Surveen Chawla in the lead role .The show was premiered on the OTT platform on 17 December 2021. In the show, Madhavan plays the role of Arya Iyer, a writer. His marriage with his estranged wife, played by Surveen Chawla of ‘Sacred Games’ fame is on the rocks, but the couple has to keep up the facade of a happy family for the sake of their daughter who is terrified of her parents divorcing. Bhagat makes a cameo in the show, as India's bestselling author. To sum up, ‘Decoupled’ is an interesting take on separating couples while also touching upon today's trending topics on social media.

The show has been created by Manu Joseph and directed by Hardik Mehta and it turned out to be the No. 1 Indian series on Netflix in less than 72 hours after its release and the second most watched Netflix show in India.

Bibliography

Novels 

 Five Point Someone (2004)
 One Night @ the Call Center (2006)
 The 3 Mistakes of My Life (2008)
 2 States (2009)
 Revolution 2020 (2011)
 Half Girlfriend (2014)
 One Indian Girl (2016)
 The Girl in Room 105 (2018)
 One Arranged Murder (2020)
 400 Days (2021)

Non-fiction 

 What Young India Wants (2012)
 Making India Awesome (2015)
 India Positive (2019)

Awards and accolades 
 Chetan Bhagat was recognized by IIM Ahmedabad as “The best outgoing student” in 1997.
 Chetan won the Society Young Achiever's Award in 2000.
 He won the Publisher's Recognition Award in 2005.
 Featured on Time magazine's list of World's 100 Most Influential People of 2010 in the Artists category.
 Listed '47' among the "100 Most Creative People 2011" by the Fast Company American business magazine and business media brand.
 Won the "CNN-IBN Indian of the Year 2014" award in the Entertainment category.
 Ranked No. 82 on the 2017 Forbes India Celebrity 100 list.
 Won the IBN Live Movie Awards in 2014 for Best Screenplay for Kai Po Che.
 Won the Zee Cine Awards in 2014 for Best Story for Kai Po Che.
 Honoured with Golden Book Awards 2022 for the Book - 400 Days.

References

External links 

 
 
 

1974 births
English-language writers from India
IIT Delhi alumni
Indian male novelists
Living people
Punjabi people
Indian writers
Indian Institute of Management Ahmedabad alumni
21st-century Indian novelists
Screenwriters from Delhi
Indian male screenwriters
21st-century Indian essayists
Indian male essayists
20th-century Indian journalists
The Times of India journalists
Indian male journalists
20th-century Indian male writers
21st-century Indian male writers
Novelists from Delhi